Sun Ray is a thin-client workstation computer.

Sun Ray or Sunray may also refer to:

Natural world
 A ray of sunlight
 Crepuscular rays, rays of sunlight radiating through gaps in clouds
 A plant of genus Enceliopsis
 The common name of the Western Australian daisy Rhodanthe manglesii

Music
 The Sunrays, a pop music band managed by Murry Wilson
 "Sunray", a song by The Jesus and Mary Chain from their 1989 album Automatic
 "Sunray", a song by Riley Armstrong from his 2000 album Riley Armstrong
 "Sunray", a song by Hawkwind from their 2005 album Take Me to Your Leader
 "Sun Ray", a song by Mutemath from their 2011 album Odd Soul

Places
 Sunray, Oklahoma
 Sunray, Texas

Other
 Sun Ray Photo Company, a manufacturer of photo equipment
 Sunray, a term used in radio voice procedure
 Sunrays (yacht),  a super-yacht built by Oceanco in 2010
 Operation Riviresa, also known as Operation Sunrays